The Canadian Screen Award for Best Original Music in a Documentary is an annual award, presented as part of the Canadian Screen Awards program to honour the year's best musical contributions in Canadian theatrical documentary films.

The award will be presented for the first time at the 11th Canadian Screen Awards in 2023.

2020s

See also
Prix Iris for Best Original Music in a Documentary

References

Original music in a documentary
Awards established in 2023
Film music awards
Canadian documentary film awards